The 1864 United States presidential election in New York took place on November 8, 1864, as part of the 1864 United States presidential election. Voters chose 33 representatives, or electors to the Electoral College, who voted for president and vice president.

New York voted for the National Union candidate, Abraham Lincoln, over the Democratic candidate, George B. McClellan. Lincoln won the state by a bare margin of 0.92%.

Results

See also
 United States presidential elections in New York

References

New York
1864
1864 New York (state) elections